Joshua Lawrence "Josh" Meador (March 12, 1911 - August 24, 1965) was an American animator, effects animator, special effects artist, and animation director for the Walt Disney studios.

Biography 
Meador was born in Greenwood, Mississippi. His family later moved to Columbus, Mississippi in 1918. He later studied at the Chicago Art Institute. There, a fellow alumnus told Meador he was traveling to California to be interviewed at Walt Disney Productions, and suggested for him to come along. At first, Meador refused as he wanted to do commercial art, but he was coerced into interviewing at Disney. There, he was hired to work in their animation effects department, where he worked on numerous films such as 20,000 Leagues Under the Sea, for which the studio won an Academy Award. Meador also created the animation effects for the 1956 MGM science-fiction film Forbidden Planet, most notably the "Monster from the Id" that attacks the spaceship. Privately, Meador described himself as "first and foremost a painter", in which he painted more than 2,000 canvases and impressionistic landscape and seascape paintings.

In August 1965, Meador suffered a heart attack and died at his residence in Casper, California. He is buried at Friendship Cemetery in Columbus, Mississippi, which was also his hometown.  There is a historical marker at his childhood home.

Filmography

References

External links
 

1911 births
1965 deaths
American animators
Special effects people
American animated film directors
American landscape painters
Artists from Mississippi
Landscape painters
People from Greenwood, Mississippi
Walt Disney Animation Studios people